is a railway station in the city of Akita, Akita Prefecture, Japan, operated by East Japan Railway Company (JR East).

Lines
Kami-Iijima Station is served by the Ōu Main Line, and is located 308.3 km from the starting point of the line at Fukushima Station.

Station layout
The station has two unnumbered opposed side platforms serving two tracks connected by an underground passage. The station is unattended.

Platforms

History
Kami-Iijima Station began as Kami-Iijima Signal Stop on September 2, 1944. It was closed from July 11, 1949 and reopened on April 10, 1954. It was made a passenger station on February 10, 1964. The station was absorbed into the JR East network upon the privatization of JNR on April 1, 1987.

Surrounding area
 
 Iijima Elementary School

See also
List of railway stations in Japan

References

External links

 JR East station information 

Railway stations in Akita Prefecture
Ōu Main Line
Railway stations in Japan opened in 1964
Buildings and structures in Akita (city)